Bekirli power station or İÇDAŞ Bekirli-2 power station or İÇDAŞ Biga-2 power station is a 2 unit 1200-megawatt coal-fired power station in Turkey in Çanakkale Province owned by İÇDAŞ, which burns imported and local coal and receives capacity payments. İşbank provided construction finance. Opponents say it is one of many polluting industries in the area.

It is estimated that closing the plant by 2030, instead of when its licence ends in 2056, would prevent over 5000 premature deaths.

References

External links 

 Bekirli power station on Global Energy Monitor

Coal-fired power stations in Turkey